Saint Lucia requires its residents to register their motor vehicles and display vehicle registration plates. Current plates are North American standard 6 × 12 inches (152 × 300 mm). Older license plates are owner provided and come in different styles.

References

Saint Lucia
Transport in Saint Lucia
Saint Lucia-related lists